Henry O. "Molly" Crawford (April 28, 1901 – August 2, 1967) was an American football and track and field coach. He served as the head football coach at Sam Houston State University from 1936 to 1937. He also served as the school's track coach beginning in 1929.

Head coaching record

Football

References

External links
 

1901 births
1967 deaths
Austin College alumni
Sam Houston Bearkats football coaches